"Love and Marriage" is the 20th episode of the third season of M*A*S*H. It was originally broadcast on February 18, 1975.

Overview
Hawkeye and Trapper John play matchmaker while performing required examinations of soldiers who are asking permission to marry locals. They help a soldier reunite with his pregnant Korean wife, and attempt to stop a young soldier from marrying a tuberculosis-infected prostitute so she can be sent to the United States to find new customers.

Detailed summary

Surgeons are packed together in the OR working on wounded soldiers, and Frank is being mocked.  Frank, in response, continuously insults Mr. Kwang, the new orderly who fumbles a bit with the instruments.  After the shift is over and the guys are washing up, Mr. Kwang apologizes for messing up, but Frank still lectures him.  The doctor and other surgeons insult Mr. Kwang for being bad at his job and they tell him that he will have to shape up or "Or we won't save your country."  Trapper and Hawkeye defend Kwang and get in another jab at Frank.

Outside the OR, Trapper and Hawkeye invite Mr. Kwang to their tent for a drink.  The doctor apologizes "For Frank Burns on behalf of the United States as well as Canada and Mexico." After the doctors observes that Kwang speaks English very well, Mr. Kwang explains that he studied at the University of Seoul when the war broke out.  Soon after that he was "recruited" by being thrown into a truck and sent to a surgical clinic.  Soon after that he was transferred to the 4077th.

Mr. Kwang ironically claims to be happy at this M.A.S.H. and they drink to the irony.  He then explains his one regret, that before he was dreafted, he was unable to say goodbye to his wife.  Hawkeye and Trapper, in response, promise that they will find him a 3-day pass so that he can see his wife.

Trapper and Hawkeye are inspecting a soldier and joke that his Korean bride to be is young enough for him to adopt as his child, saying he should be able to get her into the movies at half price.  Later, Trapper and Hawkeye are giving marriage physicals to soldiers and their prospective wives.  Off to the side, Hawkeye promises Radar a new book on reproduction should the corporal be able to get that 3-day pass for Mr. Kwang.  Radar tricks Henry into signing the pass.

Back in the exam room, Danny McShane comes in with his fiance, Soong-hi, whom the doctors recognize as an older prostitute from Rosie's Bar.  After a brief discussion, Trapper and Hawkeye take McShane into the hall and ask him about his betrothed.  McShane claims that Soong-hi is only 21 years old and that they "really love each other."  After more persuading, McShane agrees to wait two weeks before going through with the marriage.

Later that night in the Swamp, Henry, Trapper, Hawkeye, Radar, and Staff Sergeant Zelmo Zale are playing poker. The doctor jokes that enlisted men can fall in love with whoever they want, so long as its other enlisted men.  The men hear a ruckus outside.  Mr. Kwang is being stopped and asked for his papers.  He hands the guard his permission to leave that was given to him earlier by Trapper and Hawkeye.   Inside the tent the men playing poker can hear the argument escalating outside.  Someone says that perhaps an officer should go out and investigate, they ignore this thought and then a gunshot is heard.  Henry tries to send Radar out to investigate, but Frank, the Officer of the Day, walks in with what he claims is a forged 3-day pass.  Henry agrees that he didn't sign the paper, but Radar points out that it is indeed Henry's signature on the paper.  Regardless, Frank is pretty miffed and threatens to charge Mr. Kwang with desertion because even after Frank tried to stop him Kwang ran away.  Then, after saying he is good with guns, Frank fires his gun accidentally into the hanging lamp in the tent.

The next day, Hawkeye and Trapper are in the exam room when Radar comes in to tell them that someone is in the Swamp asking to see them.  Once the guys get to their tent, they see Mr. Pak, who is apparently a successful but somewhat dishonest merchant.  Pak is there to offer each of the doctors $250 if they will ok McShane and Soong-hi's marriage.  He explains that if the two of them get married, then Soong-hi can go to the United States where she will work for some friends of his.  Hawkeye and Trapper chase him from the tent.

Just then, the doctors come upon Kwang who is escorted by two MPs.  He explains that he was trying to get back to his village because his wife is about ready to give birth to their first child.  Trapper and Hawkeye take the matter to Henry, who refuses to let Kwang go because he doesn't want to get in any more trouble, as people have been turning in reports on him.  Henry gives in a little and says that he can drop the charges of desertion, but he still can't let Kwang leave the camp.  He does, however allow Radar and Hawkeye to go to the village and pick up Mrs. Kwang and bring her back to the camp.

The two of them leave on the bus, and later, when Trapper is in the Swamp, McShane stops by for a visit.  Trapper explains that he asked McShane over so that he could congratulate McShane on his upcoming wedding.  However, Trapper has something else to share, that is, Soong-hi has tuberculosis, eliminating any chance of her being shipped stateside with an infectious disease.  McShane looks at the x-ray and leaves quickly.

Meanwhile, Radar and Hawkeye have managed to pick up Mrs. Kwang, and are riding back to the camp.  It's a little too late, however, because Mrs. Kwang goes into labor.  Radar flips and panics, while Hawkeye gets ready to help deliver the baby.

When the boys get back to camp, they present a healthy son to Mr. Kwang, who names his child after Radar, Trapper, Hawkeye, and Henry.

Cast
 Alan Alda as Cpt. Hawkeye Pierce
 Wayne Rogers as Cpt. Trapper John McIntyre
 McLean Stevenson as Lt. Col. Henry Blake
 Loretta Swit as Maj. Margaret "Hot Lips" Houlihan
 Larry Linville as Maj. Frank Burns
 Gary Burghoff as Cpl. Radar O'Reilly
 William Christopher as Father Mulcahy
 Jamie Farr as Maxwell Klinger
 Dennis Dugan as Danny McShane
 Jerry Fujikawa as Dr. Pak 
 Robert Gruber as Sergeant
 Johnny Haymer as Sgt. Zelmo Zale
 Jeanne Joe as Mrs. Kwang
 Pat Li as Soong Hi
 Soon-Tek Oh as Mr. Kwang

References

External links
 

M*A*S*H (season 3) episodes
1975 American television episodes